Billo Rani is a studio album by Malkit Singh released on 20 November 2009.

Track listing
All music composed by Bob Rai and lyrics was given by Malkit Singh.

References 

2009 albums